The list of ship launches in 1914 includes a chronological list of some ships launched in 1914.



References

Sources
 

 

1914
Ship launches